Calyciflorae is a grouping of plants that is no longer used by botanists.  Augustin Pyramus de Candolle defined it as a subclass within the class Dicotyledoneae. It overlapped largely with the modern Rosids group. The group Calyciflorae was defined as:

 Flowers with sepals united at least at the base (gamosepalous), a "torus" (disc) at the base of the calyx from which the petals and stamens appear to emerge, the ovary either free or attached to the calyx.

See also
 De Candolle system

References

Historically recognized angiosperm taxa